Slaughter of the Innocents  is a 1993 thriller film directed by James Glickenhaus and starring Scott Glenn and Jesse Cameron-Glickenhaus with supporting roles from Kevin Sorbo and Armin Shimerman. A then-unknown Aaron Eckhart has a bit part.

The film is set in the Arches National Park of Moab, Utah, and Cleveland, Ohio, USA.

Plot
In Timberlake, Utah a woman drives home one evening during a storm and barely misses a hooded figure on the side of the road. She arrives home and calls out to her two daughters who don't respond. She finds her young daughter nearly dead, covered in blood, and her living room destroyed.

Stephen Broderick (Scott Glenn) is a Cleveland FBI agent who investigates murder cases and his 10-year-old son Jesse (Jesse Cameron-Glickenhaus) is very tech savvy and has a deep interest in his father's work. Jesse mentions to his father that he has found a potential serial killer after reviewing some crime scene reports which have similarities with the Provo Canyon Massacre 5 years before with the two murdered girls from the beginning of the film. Broderick readily listens to his son's theory that the mothers in both cases say that they saw what looked like an old lady wearing a black dress picking something on the side of the road and putting it into a basket right before the bodies were discovered.

Broderick gets approval from his superiors to investigate the link. He goes to Draper Penitentiary where the man convicted and sentenced to death for the Provo Canyon Massacre, Bobby Martel, is about to be executed. Broderick is greeted by FBI Agent Roxanne Lemar (Sheila Tousey) and they discuss the evidence against Martel. His muddy footprints were found outside the bedroom window of the murdered girls, his fingerprints were on the glass, and one of his pubic hairs was found in the mouth of one of the girls. They note that Martel's footprints weren't found inside the house and that they should recheck the DNA evidence before his execution. The warden won't delay the execution because of severe public outcry for Martel's execution bordering on violent. Broderick and Roxanne consult with Dr. Mort Seger, a forensic pathologist and asks him to compare the pubic hair found at the scene with that of Bobby Martel. Dr. Seger says that they look very similar and that they would have been deemed a match with the technology from 5 years prior when the comparison was first made. They run a DNA analysis with the FBI's computer increasing the process, but the results won't be finished in time to halt the execution. Broderick talks to Martel and asks him what he saw the night of the murders. Martel says that he "saw God with the children." Martel is executed by lethal injection while still proclaiming his innocence. A few hours following the execution, the DNA results show that Martel's DNA did not match the pubic hair found at the scene.

Broderick is tasked by the FBI to investigate the case that has now been reopened in light of the DNA evidence proving Martel's innocence. Based on the evidence he surmises that Martel came to watch the girls undress through their window while the killer entered the house, stabbed the older girl, and accidentally killed the younger girl in the struggle. In the killer's frustration for accidentally killing the younger girl, the killer sexually assaults the older girls corpse while Martel watches through the window and masturbates. The killer then removes the younger girl's body and Martel is arrested soon after. Martel's boot prints are not in the house, but the killer was wearing smooth leather sandals and his prints were found in abundance though no one had noticed during the investigation.

Broderick takes his son Jesse to Timberlake, Utah to the scene of the most recent crime. Jesse finds sage on the side of the road where the old woman was reported to be standing and picking something the night of the murders. Jesse has read the files and seen the photos of the crime scene and states that the killer stabbed the girl with a 9-inch hunting knife and removed one of her ribs to take with him. Jesse surmises that with the sandal prints, the bones, the sage, and with what Martel witnessed, that the killer was dressed like God.

The killer is a bearded man who lives in the desert and dreams of being sexually assaulted and tortured in his youth. He drives his Volkswagen bus to a general store and screams "I will gather the species two by two" and when the store owner attempts to defend himself, he is killed and his two taxidermied birds are taken by the killer.

Jesse programs his computer to review crime reports looking for 25 key identifiers and to print out any with more than seven. A report in Utah has 9 identifiers and he reports the shopkeeper's death to his father. Broderick asks Jesse to go back and search crime reports for 5 years with the same criteria. Broderick and Jesse go to the general store to investigate the crime scene. While outside Jesse notices that the killer's footprints are even and level meaning that he wasn't running from the crime scene but was calmly walking away.

Broderick and Jesse summarize what they have learned. The killer is 6"2' tall and weighs 205 lbs based on the sage he stepped on, he's right-handed, his prints aren't in the system, so he's never been arrested, and he's blood type b based on physical evidence found on the sexually assaulted girl. He's also not been to the dentist in a long time due to bite marks found on the girl as well. They also know he drives a pre-1968 Volkswagen van based on markings left at the general store.

A woman stops at a gas station with her young daughter, Kristi Collins in the back seat and goes inside to pay. The cashier notices the killer dragging the girl into his van and runs outside with a revolver to stop him. He fires several times, but the killer is able to drive away with the young girl. Broderick goes back to Utah when news of the kidnapping reaches him, and Jesse goes home.

The Utah police are called due to a foul odor coming from a house. Officer Ben Olmon (Linden Ashby) is dispatched but warned that whoever called in the report called their direct number and not 911 so he should be cautious. When he arrives, there is no answer but inside he finds sage hanging from the ceiling and a man, woman, and little girl in black robes along with the ritualistically murdered body of a young boy. Jesse continues to search for matching crime criteria on his computer while Broderick investigates the house of the cultists who belong to a Moab religious sect.

The killer goes to a public library and views books on Flemish paintings. Broderick and Roxanne get a tip from the library that a man fitting the killer's description has been there recently. They ask a janitor at the library if he saw the man and the janitor says that he always comes in, sits at the same place, and takes notes while reading an art book. They find the book and dust for prints from the table and the book and find that they match the previous crime scenes. Later that night, Roxanne finds a list of other books that the killer checked out, one of which is called "Mother Less Child". She goes back to the library that night to look for the book and the killer watches her from across the street.

Roxanne and Broderick meet to go over the newly discovered book which deals with S&M photography. Broderick recounts that a woman named Sarah Proctor in the 30s believed God was going to visit her personally. When her followers died, she didn't bury them but instead placed them around a table in her basement and used sage to mask the smell. Broderick believes the killer is using sage for the same reason.

Jesse meanwhile finds an older police report where two giraffes were stolen from the Salt Lake City Zoo. He tells his mother he is going to visit his friend for the weekend but instead books a flight to Salt Lake City using his father's credit card.

Broderick and Roxanne investigate the former leader of the Moab sect named Robert Vale who has since become a militant Neo-nazi. They go to his cabin with several sheriffs and two are killed by a roadside bomb. Broderick and Roxanne go with an FBI SWAT team led by Special Agent Ken Reynolds (Aaron Eckhart) to arrest Vale but due to the overzealous nature of the SWAT team, Vale is killed.

Jesse goes to the Salt Lake City Zoo and tells a maintenance worker that he knows he isn't who he says he is and that he changed his identity after stealing money from a bank he managed and abandoning his family. When the giraffes were stolen, he didn't tell them about the real perpetrator for fear of the police finding out about who he really is and his criminal past. The maintenance worker opens the locker of the man who stole the giraffes for Jesse. His name being Mordecai Booth. Jesse finds his locker full of animal photos, sage, and a child's shoe. Jesse reviews all the items found in Booths' locker including photos of the first victims at the zoo and a scrawled passage on a crumpled bible page. Jesse accesses his home computer and cross checks the imagery described in the passage with locations near the PO box of Mordecai Booth. He is able to identify the Zion National Park, Castle Valley National Park, the Nuns and Priests Monument in Castle Rock, and a closed uranium mine directly below Castle Rock. Jesse takes a train to Castle Rock and rents a dirt bike to go to the closed uranium mine.

Jesse tries to call his father several times during his investigation, but his father is still not back from the field. Jesse locates the uranium mine and calls his father telling him that he found the killer, but the reception fails. Broderick accesses Jesse's computer and finds out the name of the killer and the coordinates of the mine. Broderick doesn't want SWAT to come with him to retrieve his son since they already killed one suspect and he fears that Jesse might be caught in the crossfire. Jesse begins to photograph the uranium mine and finds displays of several tortured and mutilated bodies. He also finds a life size ark covered with dead bodies and taxidermied animals. Jesse is found by Booth and strapped to a crucifix while Kristi Collins is still alive and tied to a pillar. Booth, now having finished his ark and gathered two of every animal, asks God to send the rains and releases the ark on its tracks. Broderick arrives and wounds Booth before he is able to sacrifice Jesse. He climbs aboard the ark and is able to free both Kristi and Jesse before the ark falls off the cliff at the end of the tracks. Booth is killed in the crash and Broderick, Jesse, and Kristi are picked up by Roxanne in a helicopter. Later, Broderick and Jesse are walking through a cemetery and Broderick shows Jesse that he has bought a plot for Bobby Martel. Broderick explains that Martel was just as much a victim as anyone else and that they have to make sure injustices like that don't happen again. Jesse asks why people have to die and Broderick assures him that good things don't die and that they live on in other people and that's why he's proud of the good things his son has done.

Cast
 Scott Glenn as FBI Special Agent Stephen Broderick
 Jesse Cameron-Glickenhaus as Jesse Broderick
 Darlanne Fluegel as Susan Broderick
 Sheila Tousey as FBI Special Agent Roxanne Lemar
 Jan Broberg Felt as Cindy Lockerby
 Elizabeth Johnson as Stephanie Lockerby
 Zitto Kazann as Mordecai Booth
 Terri Hawkes as Ellen Jenkins
 Kevin Sorbo as John Willison
 J. Stephen Brady as Bobby Martel
 Tim Colceri as Warden Bates
 Armin Shimerman as Dr. Mort Seger
 Aaron Eckhart as FBI Special Agent Ken Reynolds
 Linden Ashby as Officer Ben Olmon
 Henry Brown as Stanley Moorehead

Production
Parts of the film were shot in Salt Lake City, Provo Canyon, Provo airport, Utah State Prison, Moab, Castle Rock Valley, Salina and Valley of the Gods in Utah.

Release
Slaughter of the Innocents originally aired on HBO on December 2, 1993.

In April 1994, the film was released on videocassette and special edition LaserDisc by MCA/Universal Home Video. In 2004, it was released on DVD by 20th Century Fox with no bonus features. The DVD is discontinued. However, Synapse Films re-issued the film on a special edition Blu-Ray on June 11, 2019.

References

External links

1993 films
1993 crime thriller films
American crime thriller films
American detective films
Films shot in Utah
Films scored by Joe Renzetti
HBO Films films
1990s English-language films
1990s American films